Nepal contains most of the Himalayas, the highest mountain range in the world. Eight of the fourteen eight-thousanders are located in the country, either in whole or shared across a border with China or India. Nepal has the highest mountain in the world, Mount Everest as well as 1,310 peaks over 6,000 m height.

Mountains

Other ranges
North of the Greater Himalayas in western Nepal, ~6,100 metre Tibetan Border Ranges form the Ganges-Brahmaputra divide, which the international border generally follows.  South of the Greater Himalayas, Nepal has a High Mountain region of ~4,000 metre summits, then the Middle Hills and Mahabharat Range with 1,500 to 3,000 metre summits.  South of the Mahabharats, an outer range of foothills with ~1,000 metre summits is called the Siwaliks or Churiya Hills.

Gallery of highest peaks

See also 

List of unclimbed mountains of Nepal
 List of highest mountains

References

Mountains of Nepal
Nepal
Mountains
Nepal